Bertha Yolanda Rodríguez Ramírez (born 3 September 1962) is a Mexican politician from the Institutional Revolutionary Party. From 2006 to 2009 she served as Deputy of the LX Legislature of the Mexican Congress representing Jalisco.

References

1962 births
Living people
Politicians from Jalisco
Women members of the Chamber of Deputies (Mexico)
Institutional Revolutionary Party politicians
21st-century Mexican politicians
21st-century Mexican women politicians
University of Guadalajara alumni
People from Autlán, Jalisco
Deputies of the LX Legislature of Mexico
Members of the Chamber of Deputies (Mexico) for Jalisco